Uppum Mulakum is an Indian Malayalam-language sitcom, that has been broadcast on Flowers since 14 December 2015. The sitcom was created by R. Unnikrishnan, who also directs it, after he returned to the director role in the second season. Uppum Mulakum depicts the everyday life of Balachandran Thampi, his wife Neelima, and their five children. The main cast includes Biju Sopanam, Nisha Sarang, Rishi S. Kumar, Juhi Rustagi, Al Sabith, Shivani Menon, Baby Ameya and Parvathy Ayyappadas. Baby Ameya joined the show as the newborn baby of Balachandran and Neelima in May 2018, when she was four months old and Parvathy Ayyappadas joined the main cast in February 2022, as the wife of elder son Vishnu.

It crossed 1,000 episodes in 2019.  The first season of the show aired from 14 December 2015 to 15 January 2021, consisting of 1206 episodes. 

The second season of the show began broadcast on 13 June 2022. Juhi Rustagi, who previously had left the show in January 2020 when it reached 1013 episodes came back to the show in the second season. 

Uppum Mulakum is one of the most popular and longest running Malayalam sitcoms that has been acclaimed throughout its run. The show won the Kerala State Television Award for Best Comedy Show in 2017.

Plot summary

Season 1
The sitcom revolves around the family of Balu; a self-employed electronics technician, his wife Neelu, who works as an accountant in a private firm, and their five children: Vishnu who's called "Mudiyan" by his family's due to his hair, Lakshmi "Lechu", Keshav "Keshu", Shivani "Shiva" and Parvathi "Parrukutty". The family is usually referred to as Paramada Veedu.

Vishnu is a new-generation, lively dancer. Earlier he was often teased by his siblings for failing in his BSc examinations. He is Neelu's eldest and favorite son. He has a dance troupe. His hairstyle makes him a popular character. He even took care of his baby sister when no one was at home. In episode 803, he passed his BSc, which made the family happy, and thanks to Meenu his friend, Vishnu got a job at an advertisement company with an income. He lost the job and later joined in a private bank.

Lechu is the lazy, beauty-conscious eldest daughter of the family. She often teases her younger siblings. She loves writing poems and singing. She is always seen chatting with her friends. Later she joined for B.Com. She married Sidharth in episode 1011 and was last seen in season 1 during the 1013th episode (This was due to Juhi Rustagi leaving the show). 

Keshu and Shiva are the school-going kids of the house. Keshu is a foodie while Shiva doesn't enjoy eating. Both are naughty but they share an unbreakable bond with each other. They make naughty plans together and Lechu always gets threatened by them. All of them love each other even though they keep fighting all day.

They are eventually joined by Parrukutty, the baby of the family. She is an adorable baby who has won the hearts of her family members. She was born in episode 604.

They are occasionally visited by Balu's brother Surendran Thambi, his parents Madhavan Thambi and Sharada, his aunt, his cousin Rema, Rema's husband Jayanthan, Rema's father (Balu's relative) Shankaran Thambi, Neelu's parents Kuttan Pillai and Bhavani Amma. Their neighbors Bhasi, Nawas, Shukoor, newspaper boy Kannan, auto-rickshaw driver Chandran, Chandran's wife Kanakam (who is the daughter of Balu's distant relative) also make appearances. Neelima's brother Sreekkuttan (played by S. P. Sreekumar) also made appearances during the early episodes of the show. Vishnu's friends Jerry, Meenakshi, and Jennah along with Lechu's friend Gayathri also make certain appearances.

They visit Paramada Veedu and sometimes stay there. Some episodes are even taking place at their places called Shoolamkudi house at Neyyattinkara in Thiruvananthapuram and Padavalam Veedu at Piravom in Ernakulam. This too highlights Trivandrum vs Kochi in a comic manner as it is seen in common disputes between Balu and Neelu

Balu's brother Surendran who runs a grocery shop in Neyyattinkara is a soft person and Balu often ridicules him.

Shankaran (Shankara Annan)is a drunkard who is loved by everyone in the family. His daughter Rema is Balu's cousin and is married to Jayanthan who is a jobless politician. Both of them have silly fights which are often resolved by Balu and Neelu.

In episode number 368, the character of Autodriver Chandran was introduced. He later becomes a close friend of the Paramada family. Eventually, in episode 850, he marries Kanakam, a distant relative of Balu who hails from Tamil Nadu.

In episode 1164, the character Sreeraj who has been mentioned since the beginning of the show was introduced. Sreeraj is the eldest brother of Neelu who is settled in Chennai with his family.

Season 2
In season 2, it was revealed that Balu is no more working as a full time electrician. Instead, he is now working as supervisor in a construction firm. Neelu is now promoted as the manager of the private firm. Lechu came back in season 2 and it was revealed that Lechu's husband now works abroad so that she can stay with her parents. Shiva and Keshu have further grown up with Keshu started taking private tution for students. Paru has started going to nursery for her primary education.

During the 180th episode in season 2, a major development occured in the plot involving Vishnu. He eloped with his girlfriend and married her without telling both of their family and brought her home while their family was looking for a marriage alliance. Eventually, Vishnu's father-in-law, who is a businessman reached Paramada Veedu in search of his daughter.

Cast

Main Cast

 Biju Sopanam as Shulamkudi Veetil Balachandran "Balu" Thampi -  Neelima's Husband; Vishnu, Lakshmi, Keshav, Shivani and Parvathy's Father; Madhavan Thampi and Sharada's son; Kuttan Pillai and Bhavani's son-in-law; Surendran's and Rajendran's brother; Sreekuttan and Sreeraj's brother-in-law: Siddarth and Diya's father in law. He hails from Neyyantinkara and currently resides at a rented house in Vazhakkala, Kochi
 Nisha Sarang as Neelima "Neelu" Balachandran Thambi (née Neelima Pillai) - Balachandran's Wife; Vishnu, Lakshmi, Keshav, Shivani and Parvathy's Mother; Kuttan Pillai and Bhavani's daughter; Madhavan Thambi and Sharada's daughter-in-law; Sreekuttan and Sreeraj's sister; Surendran's and Rajendran's sister-in-law. Narayani kuttyamma's granddaughter. Siddarth and Diya's mother in law. 
 Rishi S Kumar as Vishnu "Mudiyan" Balachandran Thambi - Balachandran and Neelima's Eldest Child; Diya's husband; Lakshmi, Keshav, Shivani and Parvathy's Elder Brother; Kuttan Pillai, Bhavani, Madhavan Thambi and Sharada's grandson; Surendran, Rajendran, Sreekuttan and Sreeraj's nephew.
 Juhi Rustagi as Lakshmi "Lachu" Sidharth (née Lakshmi Balachandran Thambi) - Balachandran and Neelima's second child; Vishnu, Keshav, Shivani and Parvathy's sister; Sidharth's wife; Kuttan Pillai, Bhavani, Madhavan Thambi and Sharada's granddaughter; Surendran, Rajendran, Sreekuttan and Sreeraj's niece, Diya's sister in law
 Al Sabith as Keshav "Keshu" Balachandran Thambi - Balachandran and Neelima's Third child; Vishnu, Lakshmi, Shivani and Parvathy's brother; Kuttan Pillai, Bhavani, Madhavan Thambi and Sharada's grandson; diya's brother in law
 Shivani Menon as Shivani "Shiva" Balachandran Thambi - Balachandran and Neelima's Fourth child; Vishnu, Lakshmi, Keshavan and Parvathy's sister; Kuttan Pillai, Bhavani, Madhavan Thambi and Sharada's granddaughter; Diya's sister in law
 Baby Ameya as Parvathy "Paru" Balachandran Thambi - Balachandran and Neelima's Fifth child; Vishnu, Lakshmi, Keshavan and Shivani's younger sister; Kuttan Pillai, Bhavani, Madhavan Thambi and Sharada's granddaughter; Diya's sister in law
 Parvathy Ayyappadas as "Diya" Vishnu Balachandran - Vishnu's wife; Balachandran and Neelima's eldest daughter-in-law, Lakshmi, Keshav, Shivani and Parvathy's sister in law; Kuttan Pilla, Bhavani, Madavan Thampi and Sharada's granddaughter in law

Recurring

Guest
This is a list of the celebrities who have made guest appearances in the show.

Production

Season 1
Nisha Sarang was offered the role of Neelima when she was doing the cookery show Kuttikkalavara on Flowers. Except for Sarang, all other principal actors were beginners in television. Theatre actor Biju Sopanam had earlier acted under R. Unnikrishnan's directorial in Back Benchers, a comedy serial on Amrita TV. He was offered the role of Balachandran Thampi. Biju was keen on working with Unnikrishnan ever since he watched his directorial sitcom Marimayam on Mazhavil Manorama, he wanted to do such roles that are close to reality. Uppum Mulakum was his second television appearance and the first leading role. Unnikrishnan called Rishi S. Kumar for the role of Vishnu after seeing him in the reality TV show D 4 Dance on Mazhavil Manorama, in which he was a contestant. It was Unnikrishnan's son who recommended him. Al Sabith and Shivani Menon were also picked from reality TV show, they were both contestants on the show Kuttikkalavara on Flowers. Shivani is one month elder than Al Sabith, but it is the other way in the show. Juhi Rustagi was Unnikrishnan's son's friend, they first met on his son's birthday party and few days later she was offered the role of Lachu.

Biju's real-life brother, Binoj, who is five years younger than him, portrays his brother Surendran Thambi on the show. Biju's real-life daughter Gouri Lakshmi portrays his niece Kanmani, Surendran's daughter. The show was filmed at a house named Paramada Veedu in Vazhakkala, Kochi. In July 2018, R. Unnikrishnan was replaced by cinematographer S.J Sinu as the show's director. Later Pradheep Madhav was chosen as the director of the show.

Final episodes
Uppum Mulakum's rating began to drop slightly when Juhi Rustagi left the show in January 2020. When the show started back its production after several months of lockdown due to COVID-19 pandemic, a new character called Pooja Jayaram was introduced. Still the show did not managed to get back the rating like that of in its earlier days. Around the same time, Flowers TV launched another sitcom called Chakkappazham in August 2020. After airing the last episode on 15 January 2021, Uppum Mulakum stopped its broadcast. Flowers TV managing director Sreekandan Nair later announced that the show would undergo a hiatus for an extended period of time. But in February 2021, it was unofficially confirmed by the fans that the show is not on hiatus and has been cancelled. Later in March 2021, Biju Sopanam and Nisha Sarang finally revealed through social media that the show has been officially cancelled by the channel thus making the 1206th episode aired on 15 January as its final episode.

Season 2
During the 1 June 2022 episode of "Flowers Oru Kodi", Nair announced that the second season of Uppum Mulakum is under development and will start broadcast on 13 June 2022. They also released a teaser of the second season on the channel and social media announcing the same. The show's creator and initial director R. Unnikrishnan was bought back in the director role. Juhi Rustagi, who left the show in January 2020 also made a comeback. The first episode of the second season was premiered on 13 June 2022 and it became number one trending topic on YouTube.

Reception
Uppum Mulakum is one of the most popular sitcoms in Malayalam. The show has one of the biggest fan base for a Malayalam TV show and is acclaimed by the audience for its realistic touch.

Critical response
Indian express stated; "Uppum Mulakum presents the simple things in daily life without losing its originality. Behind the show's popularity is that the audience can feel that the house and its family members may have been living somewhere else in the real life".

Awards 
Flowers Comedy Awards 2016
 Most popular serial
 Best onscreen pair
Flowers TV Awards 2017
 Most popular serial
 Best actor – Biju Sopanam
Mangalam TV Awards 2017
 Best comedian – Biju Sopanam
 Best comedian female - Nisha Sarang
 Best child actor - Shivani Menon, Al Sabith
Kerala State Television Awards 2017
 Best comedy series
 Best comedian – Biju Sopanam
 Best comedian (Special jury) - Nisha Sarang
Adoor Bhasi Memorial Awards 2017
 Most popular actress - Nisha Sarang
North American Film Awards
Best actress (Television) - Nisha Sarang
 Janmabhoomi Awards 2019
Best child artist - Al Sabith
Kerala State Television Awards 2020
Special jury award – Shivani Menon

Controversy 
In July 2018, Nisha Sarang raised allegations of sexual harassment against the serial director R. Unnikrishnan, after which the Kerala Women's Commission registered a case against him. Later, she decided to continue in the serial after the channel assured that the director will be replaced.

In February 2020, the main cast actors had some issues in the set against the scriptwriter due to which they all walked away, much to the disappointment of the fans. Sooner than later, all the issues were solved by the changing of the scriptwriter and the crew was back in action.

Episodes 
<onlyinclude>

Adaptations
Flowers TV subsequently started a behind-the-scenes programme of Uppum Mulakum named Uppile Mulaku, which was hosted by Nandini Nair.
Uppum Mulakum is dubbed into Tamil as Uppum Karavum on Flowers Tamil YouTube channel. They also put up special episodes during festivals like Onam.

Reboot
In October 2021, Zee Keralam started developing a new spiritual reboot of the sitcom, with the idea of reimagining the original series. The show titled Erivum Puliyum featuring the actors of the Uppum Mulakum playing new characters started airing from 17 January 2022 However the show went off-air on 13 May 2022 due to low TRP Ratings and negative reviews from the fans.

See also
List of television programs by episode count
List of longest-running Indian television series

References

External links 
 

Indian television sitcoms
Malayalam-language television shows
Flowers (TV channel) original programming